Simpson Conservation Park (formerly the Simpson Conservation Reserve) is a protected area in the Australian state of South Australia located in the locality of Porkys Flat  on Dudley Peninsula on Kangaroo Island about  south of Penneshaw.  The conservation park was proclaimed under the National Parks and Wildlife Act 1972 in 2010 over crown land previously dedicated as a conservation reserve in 1986.  The conservation park is classified as an IUCN Category Ia protected area.

References

External links
Entry for Simpson Conservation Park on protected planet

Conservation parks of South Australia
Protected areas established in 1986
1986 establishments in Australia
Protected areas of Kangaroo Island
Dudley Peninsula